Ricardo Robertho Merani (born October 27, 1989 in Wamena, Papua, Indonesia) is an Indonesian footballer that currently plays for Persiwa Wamena in the Indonesia Super League.

References

External links

1989 births
Living people
People from Wamena
Indonesian Christians
Indonesian footballers
Liga 1 (Indonesia) players
Persiwa Wamena players
Association football midfielders
Association football defenders